Alice Chapman (1860–1929) was an Australian artist known for her portraits and genre paintings (scenes depicting ordinary people in everyday situations). Her oeuvre also included, amongst other subjects, still life paintings.

Early life 
The Chapman family was living in Inglewood, Victoria when Alice was born in 1860. The site was a significant gold field until the end of the century. Her father Joel Chapman was a quartz miner. Her mother was Anne Robertson; who married Joel Chapman in 1858. Alice was the first born child and she had three younger sisters. Her family left the gold fields and moved to the suburb of Armadale in Melbourne during her childhood. Joel Chapman died in Armadale in 1908, aged 81; his wife Anne died in St Kilda 1912, aged 72.

After her schooling Chapman embarked upon her formal training as an artist, attending the National Gallery of Victoria Art School 1876–1886. While there she studied under G. F. Folingsby. She was amongst the women students at the school who rebelled against the unequal treatment of male and female students. For this assertiveness Chapman was punished by dismissal (although she was re-instated by the trustees after an outcry in the press and the art community).

During her years of training, her fellow students included some of the artists who were central to the future development of Australian impressionism, known as the Heidelberg school, many of whom she knew through her membership of the Buonarotti Club. Tom Roberts was one such who, in 1887, painted her younger sister, Ethel Chapman, (aged 12), Blue eyes and Brown

Career 

On completion of her training, Chapman chose No. 8, Planet Chambers, Collins Street, Melbourne for her professional studio. She chiefly specialised in portraiture and genre painting, and regularly showed her work in public exhibitions, with success.

Exhibitions in which she participated included:

1887  Australian Art Association exhibition, There’s nothing new under the sun.

1888  Melbourne Centennial Exhibition. Gained Jury awards for Sitting in State and Gretchen 

1888-1892  Victorian Artists Society Chapman showed regularly with the Society 

One of her putative paintings, Wharves near Spencer Street, 1910, can be seen online in the collection of the State Library of Victoria, which states that although the painting was owned by Chapman, it is now thought possibly to be by another painter.

She painted a portrait of noted concert singer Philip Newbury, which was shown at the home of him and his wife as part of an event for the Austral Salon. She exhibited alongside such well known artists as Frederick McCubbin, Walter Withers, and Clara Southern.

Chapman was honoured in 1894, by being appointed an Honorary Life Governor of the Bendigo Art Gallery, in the same year that she won the gallery's gold medal for figure painting for her work of Mr J. F. Sullivan, first mayor of Bendigo. Sullivan was not the only mayor she painted, Chapman also doing a portrait of H. M. Gooch, mayor of Prahran, that was to be hung in Prahran Town Hall. In her time she was referred to as "one of the most conscientious and versatile of Australian born painters." 

She was a member of the Victorian Artists’ Society until 1908, and had exhibited there on a regular basis until 1892.

In 1911 Chapman's sister, Ethel Margaret (b. 1875) died. Ethel had married Ewart Paul in 1904. The two young Paul children, Violet Evelyn (b. 1907) and Charles William (b. 1910), became the responsibility of Chapman and her two unmarried sisters. Thus for the next 14 years there was less time for Chapman to devote to her art, and she accepted no more commissions for portraits.

Death and legacy 
In 1929 Chapman died, at the age of 65. She was living in St. Kilda with her sisters, Elinor (b. 1870) and Jessie (1868-1956) who had helped her to raise her niece and nephew.

See also 
 National Gallery of Victoria Shaw Research Library
 National Library of Australia, file:
 State Library of Victoria, papers,

References 

1860 births
1929 deaths
Australian women painters
20th-century Australian women artists
20th-century Australian artists
19th-century Australian women artists
19th-century Australian artists
People from Inglewood, Victoria